Õisu Landscape Conservation Area is a nature reserve situated in Viljandi County, Estonia.

Its area is 595.5 ha.

The protected area was designated in 1959 to protect the nature of Õisu and its surroundings. In 2006, the protected area was redesigned to the landscape conservation area.

References

Nature reserves in Estonia
Geography of Viljandi County